The International Year of Light and Light-based Technologies 2015 or International Year of Light 2015 (IYL 2015) was a United Nations observance that aimed to raise awareness of the achievements of light science and its applications, and its importance to humankind. Under the leadership of UNESCO, the IYL 2015 brought together hundreds of national and international partners to organize more than
13,000 activities in 147 countries. The audience reached by the IYL 2015 is estimated to be over 100 million.

History
The first idea for an International Year of Light dates back to 2009 when John Dudley, IYL 2015 Steering Committee Chair, proposed the idea whilst representing the Quantum Electronics and Optics Division (QEOD) of the European Physical Society (EPS) at a meeting of the International Council of Quantum Electronics (ICQE) in Baltimore, USA. An item that was discussed at this meeting was how to follow up activities that were planned to celebrate the 50th anniversary of the laser (LaserFest) in 2010 with something even more ambitious. The photonics community felt that there was a real opportunity to reach out beyond the scientific sector to raise much broader awareness of the problem-solving potential of light-based science in so many areas of life, and to make a global effort to influence education and policy in both developed and developing countries. The proposal was endorsed by ICQE and thus began the adventure towards IYL 2015. International Years are part of the United Nations (UN) declared observances that promote awareness of issues relevant to its aims and international programmes.  The first step to successfully achieve the proclamation of the International Year was to work through UNESCO to prepare and submit a resolution to the UN General Assembly.  But before this, EPS had to construct the proposal in detail and build a consortium amongst the major optics and physics societies. During 2010 and 2011, the main motivations and goals for IYL 2015 were drafted, and it was decided that 2015 would be the target year based on several key scientific anniversaries. With the support of the EPS President Luisa Cifarelli, an important milestone occurred in September 2011 when the Italian Physical Society and EPS organized in Varenna, Italy, the Passion for Light launch meeting for IYL 2015, where representatives of UNESCO and the Abdus Salam International Centre for Theoretical Physics (UNESCO-ICTP) were present, both to learn more about our plans and to show their support. This was the essential step that brought the guidance and experience of UNESCO's International Basic Science Programme to the proposal.
With the help of the Institute of Physics (especially Sir Peter Knight who was the president at the time), EPS led a delegation to the International Union of Pure and Applied Physics (IUPAP) General Assembly in London, United Kingdom, during November 2011 to obtain endorsement, providing an important green light recognizing the international nature of the proposal. At this point there were many partners involved: in addition to EPS and its own European member societies, the IYL 2015 team included the African Physical Society, the American Physical Society, the Association of Asia Pacific Physical Societies, the Chinese Optical and Physical Societies, the European Optical Society, the International Commission for Optics (ICO), the IEEE Photonics Society, the Optical Society (OSA), the international society for optics and photonics (SPIE), as well as many other partners and societies from Africa, Australia, Canada, the Middle East, New Zealand, South America, and elsewhere. From March 2012 things moved quickly. With help from the Director of UNESCO's International Basic Science Programme Dr. Maciej Nalecz, a consortium of supporting UNESCO member states was assembled. Much support was needed from a number of international scientific partners at this stage, and it is essential here to acknowledge Francis Allotey (Ghana) and Ana María Cetto (Mexico) for their leading roles. Other assistance was provided by Zsolt Fulop (Hungary), John Harvey and Geoff Austin (New Zealand), Zohra Ben Lakhdar and Mourad Zghal (Tunisia), Joe Niemela (UNESCO-ICTP), Lluis Torner (Spain) and Sergei Bagaev and Victor Zadkov (Russia). A resolution supporting IYL 2015 was prepared and was adopted by the UNESCO Executive Board at its 190th session which took place at the UNESCO HQ in Paris, France, 3–18 October 2012. The resolution was placed before the Executive Board by Ghana, Mexico, the Russian Federation (Board Members), and New Zealand (UNESCO Member State).  UNESCO delegates from Ghana and Mexico introduced the proposal to the Executive Board.  The resolution was adopted by the Executive Board joined by co-signatories from a further 27 Board Members: Angola, Bangladesh, Brazil, Burkina Faso, China, Congo, Cuba, Djibouti, Ecuador, Ethiopia, Gabon, Gambia, Kenya, Indonesia, Italy, Malawi, Nigeria, Peru, the Republic of Korea, Saudi Arabia, Spain, Thailand, Tunisia, the United Arab Emirates, the United States of America, Venezuela, and Zimbabwe. Other Member States of UNESCO who declared support for the initiative were Hungary, Serbia, and South Africa. UNESCO's official support opened the gate to approach the UN General Assembly to officially endorse the International Year.

In early 2013 a meeting amongst the international stakeholders proposed ICTP as the Global Coordination Secretariat. Later in the year, with the help of UNESCO, the IYL 2015 Steering Committee was invited by Mexico to defend the proposal in New York, United States of America, at an information meeting held at UN Headquarters in May 2013. Ana Maria Cetto and John Dudley led a delegation that also included representatives of the African Physical Society (Yanne Chembo), ICTP and OSA (Anthony Johnson) and SPIE (H. Philip Stahl).

After the May 2013 meeting, Mexico led the political process to draft a resolution for the 68th Session of the UN General Assembly which would begin in September 2013.  The second half of 2013 was extremely busy, as the IYL 2015 Steering Committee really did need the declaration to be made before the end of 2013 in order to have a full 12 months to prepare.
The UNESCO Executive Board resolution was endorsed by the UNESCO General Conference at its 37th session on 19 November 2013. In parallel, a resolution was submitted to the United Nations Second Committee on 6 November 2013 by the nation of Mexico, with delegates from both Mexico and New Zealand speaking in support. The resolution was adopted with co-sponsorship from 35 countries: Argentina, Australia, Azerbaijan, Bosnia and Herzegovina, Chile, China, Colombia, Cuba, Dominican Republic, Ecuador, France, Ghana, Guinea, Haiti, Honduras, Israel, Italy, Japan, Mauritius, Mexico, Montenegro, Morocco, Nepal, New Zealand, Nicaragua, Palau, Republic of Korea, Russian Federation, Somalia, Spain, Sri Lanka, Tunisia, Turkey, Ukraine and United States of America.
Finally, the resolution A/RES/68/221 proclaiming the IYL 2015 was adopted on 20 December 2013 during a plenary meeting of the 68th Session of the UN General Assembly.

Vision goals and objectives 
The IYL 2015 was a yearlong series of events and activities with the aim of highlighting to the citizens of the world the importance of light science and optical technologies in leading to improved quality of life and for the future development of society.  A particular objective was to focus on application areas related to sustainable development, and to show how light-based technologies can provide practical solutions to global challenges in areas such as renewable energy, education, agriculture, and healthcare.

Motivation 
Light plays a central role in human activities. People throughout the world and across history have always attached great importance to light. We have seen this in cultural symbolism, universal myths and legends, and in the many ways that studying the science of light and applying it in practical applications has shaped the societies in which we live. Light is the means by which human beings see themselves, each other, and their place in the Universe. Light is an essential part of culture and art, and is a unifying symbol for the world.

On the most fundamental level through photosynthesis, light is necessary to the existence of life itself, and the many applications of light have revolutionized society through medicine, communications, entertainment and culture. Industries based on light are major economic drivers, and light-based technologies directly respond to the needs of humankind by providing access to information, promoting sustainable development, and increasing societal health and well-being.

Goals 
The major goals of the International Year of Light 2015 were:
 Improve the public understanding of how light and light-based technologies touch the daily lives of everybody, and are central to the future development of the global society.
 Build worldwide educational capacity through activities targeted on science for young people, addressing issues of gender balance, and focusing especially on developing countries and emerging economies.
 Enhance international cooperation by acting as a central information resource for activities coordinated by learned societies, NGOs, government agencies, educational establishments,  industry, and other partners.
 Focus on particular discoveries in the history of science that have shown the fundamental centrality of light in the development of knowledge, and highlight the continuous nature of discovery in different historical and cultural contexts,
 Emphasise the importance of basic research in the fundamental science of light, the need for investment in light-based technology to develop new applications, and the global necessity to promote careers in science and engineering in these fields.
 Promote the importance of lighting technology and the need for access to light and energy infrastructure in sustainable development, and for improving quality of life in the developing world.
 Raise awareness that technologies and design can play an important role in the achievement of greater energy efficiency, in particular by limiting energy waste, and in the reduction of light pollution, which is key to the preservation of dark skies.
 Highlight and explain the intimate link between light and art and culture, enhancing the role of optical technology to preserve cultural heritage.
 Maintain these goals and achievements in the future beyond the International Year of Light.
The International Year of Light contributes significantly to fulfilling the missions of UNESCO to the building of peace, the alleviation of poverty, to sustainable development and intercultural dialogue through education, science, culture, and communication. In this context the goals of IYL 2015 align with the 17 Sustainable Development Goals which were adopted by the United Nations General Assembly in 2015.

Anniversaries during 2015 
The year 2015 was a natural candidate for the International Year of Light as it represented the remarkable conjunction of a number of important milestones in the history of the science of light.

Great works on optics by Ibn Al-Haytham - over 1000 years 
The year 2015 marks the 1000th anniversary since the appearance of the remarkable seven-volume treatise on optics Kitab al-Manazir, written by the Arab scientist Ibn al-Haytham (also known by the Latinization Alhazen or Alhacen),. Born around a thousand years ago in present-day Iraq, Ibn Al-Haytham was a pioneering scientific thinker who made important contributions to the understanding of vision, optics, and light. Today, many consider him a pivotal figure in the history of optics and the "Father of modern optics". He was the first person to explain that vision occurs when light bounces on an object and then is directed to one's eyes.

Ibn Al-Haytham was one of the earliest scientists to study the characteristics of light and the mechanism/process of vision. He sought experimental proof of his theories and ideas. During many years living in Egypt, he composed one of his most celebrated works, Kitab al-Manazir, whose title is commonly translated into English as Book of Optics but more properly has the broader meaning Book of Vision.

Ibn Al-Haytham made significant advances in optics, mathematics, and astronomy. His work on optics was characterised by a strong emphasis on carefully designed experiments to test theories and hypotheses. In that regard he was following a procedure somewhat similar to the modern scientific method.

Fresnel and his theory of light as a wave - 1815 
Augustin-Jean Fresnel (1788-1827) was a French engineer and physicist who contributed significantly to the establishment of the theory of wave optics, publishing a pioneering memoire on diffraction in 1815.

At the end of the 18th century, physics was dominated by Newton's particle theory of light. Fresnel disliked Newton's theory of light mainly because of its failure to explain such basic optical phenomena as the interference effect. By developing his ideas on the wave nature of light into a comprehensive mathematical theory, Fresnel determined properties that every future theory of light would have to satisfy, and created the groundwork for the later work of James Clerk Maxwell.

The wave view did not immediately displace the ray and particle view, but began to dominate scientific thinking about light in the mid 19th century since it could explain polarization phenomena that the alternatives could not. It was not until the early 20th century that the photoelectric effect introduced firm evidence of a particle nature of light as well, therefore, paving the way for the wave-particle duality of light.

Maxwell describes his theory of light - 1865 
Another milestone commemorated in the IYL 2015 is the 150th anniversary of Maxwell's electromagnetic theory of light, a theory that changed the world forever. James Clerk Maxwell (1831-1879), born in Scotland, is considered as one of the most important scientists of all time and one of the greats in the history of physics along with Newton and Einstein. Undoubtedly, his most important scientific contribution is the theory of the electromagnetic field, fundamental not only for the comprehension of natural phenomena, but also for its many current technical applications, particularly in telecommunications.

His 1865 paper, A Dynamical Theory of the Electromagnetic Field, provides a complete theoretical basis for the treatment of classical electromagnetic phenomena. He proved that the equations of the electromagnetic field could combine into a wave equation and suggested the existence of electromagnetic waves. Calculating the speed of propagation of these waves, he obtained the value of the speed of light, and concluded that it was an electromagnetic wave.

Maxwell also left us outstanding contributions to colour theory, optics, Saturn's rings, statics, dynamics, solids, instruments, and statistical physics. However, his most important contributions were to electromagnetism.

Einstein and the General Theory of Relativity - 1915 
The year 2015 marked the 100th anniversary of Einstein's General Theory of Relativity. Albert Einstein (1879-1955) was a German-born theoretical physicist who revolutionized our understanding of the universe, and who is widely acknowledged as the most important scientist of the 20th Century.

Einstein's General Theory of Relativity fundamentally changed the way we understand gravity and the universe in general. He gave us a way to understand the universe as a whole and created one of the most beautiful theories in the history of science. The General Theory of Relativity gives us the law of gravitation and its relation to the other forces of nature. From Newton we knew about the "strength" of gravity, but his theory did not tell us how gravity pulls on things. In the General Theory of Relativity, the doctrine of space and time no longer figures as a fundamental independent of the rest of physics. Rather, the geometrical behaviour of bodies and the motion of clocks depend on gravitational fields, which in turn are produced by matter.

General Relativity helped to predict the existence of black holes, which are regions of the spacetime exhibiting such strong gravitational effects that nothing – not even light  – can escape. The theory also has important implications for cosmology, the study of the structure of the Universe. One of the consequences of the theory is that not only is the universe finite, but should be contracting or expanding, something that was confirmed years later by the US astronomer Edwin Hubble.

One of the most revolutionary predictions of the theory was the existence of gravitational waves, ripples in space-time that propagate in much the same way that ripples spread across the surface of a pond. It was only in 2016 that the LIGO experiment finally confirmed their existence, opening a new window for observing the cosmos that could change our understanding of the universe. It is worth noting here that this experimental confirmation of General Relativity, like that of Special Relativity before it, was based on using an optical instrument - an interferometer.  This reveals the power of light-based technologies in not only driving applications but also supporting research into very fundamental physics.

Penzias and Wilson discover the Microwave Background - 1965 
In 1965, the American astronomers Arno Penzias (1933) and Robert Woodrow Wilson (1936) announced the discovery of Cosmic Microwave Background (CMB) Radiation. This radiation is a relic of the light that filled the early cosmos almost 14 billion years ago, that can still be observed today across the sky at much longer wavelengths than visible light, in the domain of microwaves. Finding the CMB represented a triumph for the "Big Bang" description of the Universe. Penzias and Wilson won the Nobel Prize in Physics in 1978 for their discovery.

The detection of the CMB triggered a series of increasingly accurate experiments and detailed theoretical calculations over the past fifty years, searching for more information about the universe in this early cosmic signal. Initially NASA's COBE and WMAP satellites, and in recent years ESA's Planck satellite, have provided precise maps of the CMB that enable astrophysicists to delve into the history of the Universe, constraining its geometry and the properties of its constituents. Together with other observations, these data led to the "standard model" for cosmology: a spatially flat Universe dominated not only by dark matter, but also by the mysterious dark energy, responsible for accelerating the present expansion of the cosmos.

Charles Kao develops optical fibre communications - 1965 
Charles K. Kao (1933) is a Chinese-born Hong Kong, American, and British electrical engineer and physicist who pioneered the development and use of fiber optics in telecommunications. Kao's research laid the groundwork for high-speed data communication and the Information Age.
When Kao started work, it seemed impossible to use light for transmitting information because the available materials simply had too much loss. But Kao showed that the fibre-manufacturing process was the cause of the absorption problem, and that under better technical conditions, light could travel vast distances before being weakened by absorption. These findings unleashed a series of technological improvements and advancements, launching a new age in the history of telecommunications. For this reason Charles Kao is regarded as the "father of fiber optic communication."
In 2009, Charles Kao was awarded the Nobel Prize in Physics "for groundbreaking achievements concerning the transmission of light in fibres for optical communication."

Organization

IYL 2015 Governance
The coordination of IYL 2015 was through its steering committee that provided overall direction and guidance for IYL 2015 activities. A smaller executive board of the steering committee was responsible for many operational matters, supported by the IYL 2015 Global Secretariat located at the UNESCO Category I Institute, ICTP in Trieste, Italy. A broader advisory board played an important role in allowing them to link with diverse communities worldwide.

IYL 2015 Global Secretariat 
The central hub for the IYL 2015 was the Global Secretariat located at the Abdus Salam International Centre for Theoretical Physics (ICTP) in Trieste, Italy. The secretariat coordinated activities during the planning, execution, and evaluation of the IYL 2015. The secretariat liaised continuously with UNESCO, the National Nodes, Partners, the media, and the general public to ensure the progress of the IYL 2015 at all levels.

IYL 2015 National Nodes 
The IYL 2015 facilitated the creation of an international network to act at national and local levels. National Nodes were formed in 94 different countries to coordinate, promote, and implement IYL 2015 activities taking into account the needs and characteristics of different regions around the world. These nodes established collaborations between major national and local communities involved with IYL 2015 in each country and established a national committee that included a wide range of different partner representatives. In some cases, UNESCO National Commission members played an important role in such committees.
Relying on National Nodes was indispensable for the success of the whole project as they provided local contact points for all those interested in participating in the IYL 2015.  They also provided invaluable service in translating the international resources that were developed in English into local languages. This was especially vital in reaching school-age children and the public at large in many countries. Of course, within some countries, activities were not organised centrally via a national node, but events during 2015 still took place through ad hoc local organising committees.

Partners 
IYL 2015 brought together 189 national and international partners in a multi-disciplinary consortium. IYL 2015 was endorsed by a number of scientific unions and the International Council of Science. Amongst the German Physical Societythe Founding Partners of IYL 2015 were:
 American Institute of Physics (AIP)
 American Physical Society (APS)
 German Physical Society (DPG)
 European Physical Society (EPS)
 Abdus Salam International Centre of Theoretical Physics (ICTP)
 IEEE Photonics Society
 Institute of Physics (IOP)
 Light: Science and Applications
 The international lightsources.org network
 1001 Inventions
 Optical Society (OSA)
 International Society for Optics and Photonics (SPIE)

IYL 2015 Activities Overview 
The IYL 2015 has been one of the most successful and visible of any of UNESCO's international observances, with 13,168 registered activities involving an estimated reach of more than 100 million people. IYL 2015 was visible in a total of 147 countries worldwide through a combination of: event organisation (129 countries), or political support and commemorative stamps and coins (a further 18 countries).

Event Breakdown 
An analysis of the different type of events carried out during 2015 is given in the figure below described in terms of a number of different categories. Note that some events included several different activities (e.g. scientific lectures embedded within an art show) but in such cases we chose to include the event in the category corresponding to the primary activity that appeared in promotion.

An approximate regional breakdown of the events that took place during 2015 is as follows:  Africa (27 countries, 654 activities); the Americas (30 countries, 4,501 activities); Asia (39 countries, 2,000 activities); Europe (45 countries, 5,844 activities) and Oceania (2 countries, 169 activities).
An indicative breakdown of the distribution of activities is as follows: Multi-day scientific conferences (30%); Light-themed exhibitions and festivals (25%); One day conferences and special events (22%); Activities in schools (10%); Art and music and light shows (6%); Citizen Science activities (3%); Other e.g. Light-themed competitions, Open Days, Launch Events, Stamps and Coins etc. (4%).

Selected Activities

Opening Ceremony 19–20 January 2015,  Paris, France 
The IYL 2015 Opening Ceremony took place over 19–20 January at the iconic UNESCO Headquarters Fontenoy Building in Paris, France. More than 1,200 participants from more than 86 countries gathered to listen to 55 speakers covering diverse topics in light science and applications. Speakers included diplomats and UNESCO leaders, five Nobel laureates, NGO representatives, and industry CEOs. Subjects addressed themes such as: education and outreach; the basic physics of light; applications to the life sciences and health; energy and climate change; new light technologies; astronomy and light pollution; and culture and art. A panel discussion amongst political leaders addressed challenges for the future, and the speaker programme was complemented by performances from the New Zealand Maori group Ngāti Rānana and the American violinist Joshua Bell.

The Opening Ceremony also featured an extensive exhibition of educational resources from sponsors and partners, art and culture and music displays, and a historical exhibit on 1001 Inventions and the World of Ibn Al-Haytham. And outside the conference hall, the faces of the UNESCO building were lit up for three nights in the colours of the Aurora Borealis in a spectacular large-scale installation, Light is Here, by the Finnish Artist Kari Kola.

Closing Ceremony 4–6 February 2016, Mérida, Mexico 
The IYL 2015 Closing Ceremony took place over 4–6 February 2016 in the city of Mérida, Mexico. Over 300 participants reviewed the activities and major outcomes of the IYL 2015 and discussed enduring legacies. A message from the Secretary General of United Nations, Ban Ki Moon, stressed the tremendous positive outcome of the year, stating how "IYL 2015 has shown how the science of light, photonics, and related technologies can promote sustainable development in many fields, including climate change and energy, agriculture, health, and education." Speakers included two Nobel laureates and representatives from many other diverse sectors, and the topics covered in talks included health and life science, architecture and urban environments, new light sources for research, optics and photonics, cultural heritage, light pollution awareness, and science education.  An important component of the Closing Ceremony were a series of interactive Panel Discussions which encouraged audience participation in defining follow-up actions for the future, going beyond the IYL 2015.

Cultural and educational activities for the general public in Mérida were also organized to accompany the Closing Ceremony. Events such as a film festival, art installations, and an outreach programme in high schools and universities attracted 14,000 participants.

The ceremony was officially closed with a visit to the archaeological site Chichén Itzá, with lectures on Mayan culture and archeoastronomy, and a light and sound show over the Temple of Kukulcan.

Education Focus 
Teaching activities involving light and optics naturally lend themselves to student participation and can serve as a very effective gateway into science for young people.  All countries participating in IYL 2015 included a strong focus on education, and indeed in some cases light was chosen as a major theme of centrally coordinated National and Regional Science Weeks. This was the case, for example, in: Australia, Brazil, Czech Republic, Democratic Republic of Congo, France, Germany, Mexico and Slovakia.

It is worth describing the impact of several of these national initiatives in more detail: activities in Brazil in October–November 2015 included specific events with indigenous communities and visually impaired people; 3,500 people attended the Week of Science in Kinshasa in April 2015 on the theme of Light and Energy in the Democratic Republic of Congo; Mexico's 22nd National Science Week in November 2015 was dedicated to the IYL 2015 reaching out to over 100,000 people; the Czech Academy of Sciences dedicated its annual November science and technology festival to light and held interactive workshops for children; the Canary Islands (Spain) organized its Science Week in November 2015 combining both IYL 2015 and the International Year of Soils 2015 as its theme for the activities.

Many events had special focus on school-age children. In Bangladesh, a hands-on programme Spark of Light was conducted in 37 schools in the country reaching 2,500 high-school students; around 1,500 elementary and middle school students in five schools in China participated in the Seed of Light programme; El Salvador and Mongolia organized their National Physics Olympiads around IYL 2015; a particular regional activity in Europe was the eTwinning initiative which ran a contest for students from 62 classes from 22 different countries who had to design an experiment to explain the properties of light; the Franche-Comté region in France organised a public outreach programme LUX! which reached 13,000 young people and members of the public in one weekend; the Children's Museum in Jordan organised an exhibit and storytelling activities on "Colours" for three months in 2015 which was visited by 36,000 children; a three-month programme of the Macedonian Montessori Association implemented children's workshops in art and science of light; a Portuguese programme "Bringing Light to Schools" included teacher training in how to use light-based technologies to stimulate student interest; one event in South Africa was a year-long programme bringing light-based teaching resources to the disadvantaged area of Mamelodi targeting five local schools and 400 pupils; events in Tunisia included hands-on activities in six secondary schools in rural regions of the country.

Light Poverty 
Globally, around 1.1 billion people still do not have access to electricity and reliable lighting infrastructure.  A central aim of IYL 2015 was to raise awareness of this issue, since eradicating such "light poverty" is clearly a vital step in addressing numerous development goals.

Many IYL 2015 partners made this topic a major feature of their activities: the CEO of the IYL 2015 Patron Sponsor Philips Lighting spoke on this subject at the Opening Ceremony held at UNESCO HQ, and indeed the company focussed on providing practical solutions in many regions of the world, including an agreement to provide street lighting for 800 villages in Uttar Pradesh in India; IYL 2015 partners also participated in the public-private collective Power for All campaign that kicked off during 2015 to promote universal energy access by 2030; the IEEE Photonics Society teamed up with the NGOs SolarAid and Unite-to-Light to donate 3,200 solar lamps to remote regions in Tanzania, Kenya, Uganda, Zambia, Zimbabwe, South Africa, and the Philippines; the Solar Lights for Learning project organized educational activities and solar lantern distribution to children from schools in Namibia, Guatemala, Kenya, Chile, and Peru; a multipartner initiative led by the ICTP-linked LAM Network in Senegal delivered solar lamps also used as cell phones chargers, to schools and populations in remote villages; the VELUX Group collaborated with the social business Little Sun to distribute 14,500 solar lamps in Zambia, Zimbabwe and Sierra Leone. Other organizations focussed on raising more general awareness through novel initiatives. For example, CCT-SeeCity -  a partner of NGO Liter of Light -  ran a night-time artistic and cultural walking tour of cities in Europe (Rome, Madrid, London, Berlin, and Paris) to raise funds for low-cost solar lighting installation at a centre for women and children in a suburban village of Dakar in Senegal.

Gender, diversity, and inclusion 
Promoting the need for gender parity in science has been a major theme of the IYL 2015, aiming to address the well-known problem of minority participation of women in science, particularly at the highest level.  The IYL 2015 has worked hard in addressing this issue from its inception, and achieved 35% participation of high-level women scientists in its governing bodies and as speakers in the official Opening and Closing Ceremonies. Although such gender ratios are superior to those usually associated with the organisation of scientific bodies and conferences, clearly much more still needs to be done. Many IYL 2015 partners worked on particular initiatives to promote careers in science and engineering for young girls, as well as to improve the gender-balanced representation of scientists at all levels. Such initiatives included hands-on workshops, panels, seminars, competitions, and exhibitions highlighting women in science.  Particular partner activities included: the organisation of 64 activities by the IEEE Photonics Society's Women in Photonics and Young Professionals initiative, and the Introduce a Girl to Photonics Week in October 2015; SPIE organized events such as the annual Women in Optics Presentation during their flagship Photonics West Conference in the US in February 2015, including a panel discussion amongst women scientists on The Road Less Travelled: Women in Science & Technology Leadership; the OSA organized the Minorities and Women in OSA program/reception during the Frontiers in Optics conference in October 2015 and was involved with community initiatives such as the Girl Scouts USA/hands-on science demonstrations during the OFC conference in March 2015; the European project LIGHT2015 created a new prize for Early-Career Women in Photonics; ICFO in Spain organised a Girls and Boys and Photonics event and Girls Guide Australia developed specific educational resources on light for IYL 2015.  Other initiatives reached out to tackle problems such as the violence against women. The Woman Scream International Poetry and Arts Festival 2015 - organized from the Dominican Republic - used the theme of "Women of Light" in over 160 events in 36 countries during March 2015 to honour women and create a conscious call against violence to women through artistic expressions.
A number of IYL 2015 initiatives focussed especially on those affected by war and natural disasters: the Physics for All activity from the German Physical Society DPG brought the themes of IYL 2015 to newly arrived refugee communities within Germany, and the Nepalese IYL 2015 committee focussed mainly on activities and support for students and schools in areas impacted by the severe April 2015 earthquake.

IYL 2015 also supported the other inclusion challenges faced by society. In Thailand, UNESCO Bangkok and many other partners cooperated to light the façade of the Bangkok Art and Culture Centre with a rainbow-coloured display on 17 May 2015 to commemorate the International Day against Homophobia, Transphobia, and Biphobia. In another initiative, iconic landmarks and buildings throughout Ireland were lit orange to commemorate World Suicide Prevention Day on 10 September 2015.

High-Level Support 
The IYL 2015 partners and national committees worked very hard to reach out towards high-level decision makers through targeted events during the year.  Although certainly one aim of outreach is towards the public at large, initiatives that brought together scientific and political partners were considered essential to ensure that IYL 2015 initiatives would have a lasting impact well beyond the international year itself.
One approach to this was to seek high level patronage from figures of state.  Such support included: Queen Letizia of Spain chairing the Spanish Committee of Honor of the International Year of Light; Prince Andrew, Duke of York was the patron of IYL 2015 in the UK; the President of Ireland, Michael D. Higgins, acted as patron of IYL 2015 in Ireland; President Francois Hollande was patron of the launch of the International Year of Light in France. In addition, President Mahama of Ghana provided a message for the African Regional Conference and Exhibition on Harnessing Light and Light-based Technologies for Africa's Development.
Governments also recognized the IYL 2015 at the highest levels: The National Assembly of Korea passed a resolution in support on 16 February 2015; the Puerto Rico House of Representatives passed a resolution in support on 1 June 2015; and the International Year of Light was highlighted in the United States Senate with a statement that appears in the US Congressional Record for 17 December 2015. Other official events also commemorated IYL 2015. In the UK, two events were organised by the Parliamentary and Scientific Committee to raise awareness of the photonics sector; the closure of the IYL 2015 in Andorra was celebrated at the headquarters of the Parliament of Andorra; Member of the Duma and Nobel Laureate Zhores Alferov spoke on the IYL 2015 and topics of light technology at the Russian Parliament.

In addition to the Opening and Closing Ceremonies, high-level events with participation of UNESCO leadership included: two events at UNESCO HQ as part of the UNESCO Executive Board Future Prospects initiative with the participation of Nobel Laureates William D. Phillips (21 January 2015) and Hiroshi Amano (8 June 2015); the participation of the UNESCO Director General at the launch of IYL 2015 in Algeria (11 April 2015); the participation of the UNESCO Assistant Director General at the world's largest combined academic-industry photonics conference in Germany on 22 June 2015 and at the opening of The Islamic Golden Age of Science for the Knowledge-Based Society conference at UNESCO HQ on 14 September 2015. Other significant events of this type also included: the UNESCO National Commission of Ghana organised the African Regional Conference and Exhibition on Harnessing Light and Light-based Technologies for Africa's Development in Accra from 14–16 September 2015; a special session on IYL 2015 held at the UNESCO co-organised World Science Forum in Budapest on 6 November 2015; a side event to the 2016 ECOSOC Youth Forum held at the UN HQ in New York on 2 February 2016 organised by Founding Partner 1001 Inventions.

IYL 2015 also stimulated many national and regional initiatives to promote light science and technology.  The European Commission provided strong support through its Photonics Unit and the Photonics21 Public Private Partnership; an event organised at the National Academy of Sciences on 12 September 2015 brought together high-level partners within the USA; many other countries such as Canada, Singapore, and the UK developed new networks and/or reports promoting the impact of photonics and the need for continued investment.

France hosted the highly significant COP21 climate change conference from 5–12 December 2015, which included the participation of IYL 2015 Partner Liter of Light that promoted ecologically sustainable and cost-free lighting in developing countries.

Scientific Conferences 
Nearly all optics conferences on the regular scientific calendar for 2015 made some special effort to promote the broader goals of the IYL 2015. A description of some particular events organised especially for 2015 follows.

In addition to the African Regional Conference and Exhibition in Accra, major conferences were held elsewhere in Africa. In Cameroon, an international workshop from 24–27 November 2015 in Yaoundé attracted 100 students and young professionals from Africa and internationally. The IEEE AFRICON 2015 conference in Addis-Ababa Ethiopia from 14–17 September 2015 included a workshop focused on photonics research for African Development. In South Africa, the University of Fort Hare together with ICTP organized a workshop in Alice, Eastern Cape, South Africa from 28 September - 1 October 2015 that was attended by 80 delegates from over 25 countries.

A major scientific conference in South America was Colombia in the International Year of Light 2015 that was held in the cities of Bogotá and Medellín on 16–19 June 2015 attracting over 2,000 participants. In Ecuador, the OptoAndina 2015 event in Quito from 11–13 November 2015 attracted students from Ecuador, Peru, Bolivia, Colombia, and México. In El Salvador, an international workshop on optical spectroscopy from 25–30 March 2015 brought together academic and governmental institutions from Mexico and El Salvador, with a focus on concerns related to using optical techniques to detect dangerous materials and narcotics.

Elsewhere, a three-day international symposium on Light and Life was organized in Islamabad, Pakistan, from 14–16 October 2015; events in Europe during 2015 included the Laser World of Photonics congress from 22–25 June 2015 in Germany, and a workshop on an African synchrotron facility held at the European Synchrotron Radiation Facility in Grenoble, France from 16–20 November 2015.  In the US, the 2015 Fitzpatrick Institute for Photonics Annual Meeting from 9–10 March 2015 in Raleigh, North Carolina included Nobel Laureate speakers and many panel discussions covering themes in science and development.  In the Republic of Korea, the Optical Society of Korea meeting in Gyeongju included a panel discussion on the future of light science and technologies.

Worldwide, many laboratories and photonics institutes worldwide held open days for students and the public to learn about the work of research and optical science.  One coordinated event in particular was the International Illumination Commission (CIE) Gold Open Lab where over 50 laboratories in 19 countries held open days in the period from 9–25 May 2015.

IYL 2015 Festivals and Events running over Multiple Days 
Many science festivals and other public events running over multiple days placed particular emphasis on the theme of light during 2015.  Such large-scale visibility brought the important messages of the year to millions. A selection of highlights gives a flavour of the diversity of such events, and illustrates also how the international aspects of IYL 2015 could be sometimes effectively linked with national themes.
In New Zealand, for example, the Illuminating NZ celebration began in mid-winter to coincide with the Māori New Year Matariki (heralded by the appearance of the Pleiades on the horizon) and closed with a 9-day celebration of the coming of spring: Te Kōanga. The event programme involved thousands of participants of all ages and included art, music, and science activities. In the Philippines, a two-day public symposium IlumiNASYON from 9–16 March 2015 highlighted optics in the arts, science, and in Philippine history and culture. And in Mozambique, events in Maputo celebrating IYL 2015 were held on 10 November 2015 to coincide with celebrations of the city's founding.
Many large-scale events took place in Europe during 2015. An exhibition Discover the Power of Light! organised by the Vrije Universiteit Brussel attracted 270,000 visitors to the iconic Atomium Centre in Brussels. The European Researchers' Night on 25 September 2015 in 24 countries attracted over 1.1 million visitors, and many activities used the theme of light to align with IYL 2015. One notable example is CERN's activities on light and poetry.  The art festival Nuit Blanche was organized in Bratislava on 10 October 2015, and together with the Festival of Light (10-12 October 2015) attracted 100,000 people to the streets of the Slovak capital. The science festival organised by the German Physical Society (DPG) and the Federal Ministry of Research in Jena, attracted more than 53,000 visitors from 27 September-1 October 2015. The Athens Science Festival celebrated from 17–22 March 2015 chose as its main theme light and its applications, and attracted 33,000 participants, including 8,000 students.

Elsewhere, the TECNOPOLIS exhibition in Argentina from July–November 2015 attracted more than 700,000 visitors, and included prominent stands with experiments and art performances on the theme of light.  The Light Fest event organized in Concepción (Chile) on 11 October 2015 combined the science of light, art, photography, and dance, attracting 25,000 people. In Hong Kong, the K11 art and shopping mall displayed an exhibition Supernova Xmas Luminastic from 3 November 2015 to 3 January 2016 during the crowded Christmas season.

IYL 2015 Anniversaries and History of Science 
Many activities highlighted milestones in the history of science during 2015.

The lives and works of Ibn Al-Haytham were the focus of the majority of such events, with activities in 27 countries.  As well as individual events from IYL 2015 partners, coordinated programmes were run by 1001 Inventions in partnership with UNESCO and by the Ibn Al-Haytham International Working Group.  An important two-day conference on the Islamic Golden Age of Science for the Knowledge-Based Society ran through 14–15 September 2015 at UNESCO HQ in Paris, which included an exhibition from the Qatar National Library on efforts to preserve Islamic archives and manuscripts.

Many events on 25 November 2015 celebrated the 100th anniversary of Einstein's General Theory of Relativity. Articles in major newspapers on TV and in other media appeared around the world, and there many dedicated scientific conferences, including a three-day conference in the Philippines, "Project Einstein 2015: An International Conference Celebrating 100 Years of General Relativity." Over the week comprising 29 May 2015, events were held on the island of Principe to celebrate the 96th anniversary of the experimental confirmation of the theory during the total solar eclipse of 1919.

Maxwell and his theory of electromagnetism were a particular focus in Scotland. As well as many lectures and special events throughout the year, Maxwell's Torch, an illuminated mobile artwork created by the Institute of Physics in Scotland was used to accompany many activities, and there was a special musical composition In Time of Light created by musician PJ Moore.

The work of Augustin Fresnel was showcased in a special Fresnel Lecture on 10 March 2015 held at the Royal Institution in London and organised by the Society of Light and Lighting. The event attracted 400 people and was attended by the Duke of York. Possible links between Fresnel and the development of links between art and science were discussed in a multidisciplinary event Au Prisme d'Augustin Fresnel held at the Louvre in Paris on 2 November 2015.

IYL 2015 and Astronomy 
The International Astronomical Union (IAU) organized activities under the Cosmic Light banner, recognizing both the importance of light to astronomy as well as promoting the preservation of dark skies. The latter theme focuses on raising awareness of and reducing light pollution that results in more than 80% of the world's population living under light-polluted skies.
Dark Sky awareness was raised through many local events, as well as the citizen-science Globe at Night programme (globeatnight.org), an international citizen scientist project to measure the degree of light pollution all around the world using the human eye, and through the development of the Quality Lighting Teaching Kit.
Thousands of people around the world also participated in astronomical observation, especially during the solar eclipse on 20 March 2015 and the total lunar eclipse on 28 September 2015. Many countries and institutions held similar events under the banner of the "Night of the Stars" for public observing and one such programme on 28 November 2015 in Latin America attracted 200,000 participants.

The IAU also supported over 20 national or regional outreach efforts as part of Cosmic Light during 2015. Building on developments during the 2009 International Year of Astronomy, over 10,000 Galileoscopes were distributed during 2015 to science educators in the US, Puerto Rico, and Guam, and the GalileoMobile astronomy outreach project worked with a network of 20 schools in Argentina, Brazil, Chile, Colombia, Ecuador, and Peru.

In addition to the IAU-coordinated activities to recognize the start of IYL 2015 in January 2015, the Chandra X-ray Center released a set of images that combined data from telescopes tuned to different wavelengths of light. In addition to these images, the Chandra X-ray Center created the Light: Beyond the Bulb image bank.

Lighting and Architecture 
The year 2015 also saw many examples of the symbolic power of light with illumination of major monuments and buildings worldwide. The opening of IYL 2015 saw the Fontenoy building at UNESCO HQ in Paris illuminated from 19–20 January 2015, and on 24 January 2015, the UNESCO World Heritage Site of the old port of Valparíso (Chile) saw a public event Post Tenebras Lux attracting 50,000 people. The launch of the IYL 2015 in Ireland on 13 March 2015 saw the first ever illumination in green of the Dublin Spire, and the Night of Heritage Light organised by the Society of Light & Lighting illuminated nine UNESCO World Heritage Sites across the UK on 1 October 2015. On the truly global level, the celebration of the UN's 70th anniversary on 25 October 2015 saw 300 iconic monuments worldwide lit up in the colours of UN blue. A number of other international lighting events took place 2015. The Circle of Light Moscow International Festival from 26 September - 4 October 2015 saw 10 million visitors experience lighting and projection mapping of iconic building such as the Bolshoi Theatre. Similar mapping displays included the Legenda Aurea show on 11 October 2015 on the Colosseum in Rome, and the Brandenburg Gate from 9–18 October 2015 as part of Berlin's Festival of Lights.
Amongst other events, The Chinese Taipei Lantern Festival ran from 5–15 March 2015, included a special lantern featuring Einstein, and attracted more than 8 million visitors. A winter light festival Montréal en lumière in Canada presented an array of free outdoor light-based activities integrating digital arts and interactive initiatives. To close the IYL 2015 in South Africa, two laser projection shows were shown at the V&A Waterfront site in Cape Town, where members of the public were encouraged to "follow the light" to the source where they found an IYL 2015 stand. Running from 16–31 December 2015, an estimated 150,000 people passed through the V&A site on New Year's Eve.
Promoting light in the built environment was a special focus of the International Association of Lighting Designers (IALD). As well as hosting a special event during the LightFair conference in New York, United States of America, on 5 May 2015 that included UNESCO representation, the IALD regional chapters hosted over 100 other events in 2015. Another event on this themes was the Light Middle East conference in Dubai (United Arab Emirates) from 6–8 October 2015 that saw over 6,000 visitors from 85 different countries. IYL 2015 also saw the launch of the International VELUX Award for students of architecture to encourage and challenge students to explore the theme of daylight which by March 2016 had attracted more than 5,000 student registrations from 97 countries.

Other themes involving different aspects of light and architecture linked light and gardens.  The Gardens of Light project aimed to promote historic gardens and museums around the world and was part of the Festival of Light from 2–30 August 2015 at the Royal Łazienki Park in Warsaw (Poland) receiving around 70,000 visitors. In the UK, a Garden of Light celebrating the IYL 2015 designed by the University of Southampton won the People's' Choice Award at the RHS Tatton Park Flower Show, which was held from 22–26 July, and was featured on the BBC Two channel. Also in the UK, the e-Luminate Wine Tasting Light Experiment took place in Cambridge on 17 February 2016 to examine the effect of lighting on the perception of the taste and aroma of wine (with red and blue light seen to have a more beneficial effect).

Art and Museums 
Many artists and museums worldwide embraced IYL 2015, both through drawing attention to the International Year in the frame of their exhibits and displays, or through participation in activities organised with other partners that created new synergies between different communities.

A major event in the Netherlands used technology developed for exoplanet research to project a rainbow arch on the Amsterdam Centraal railway station. Developed by Studio Roosegaarde, Leiden University, and North Carolina State University, the Rainbow Station projection ran every day in 2015 and was seen by an estimated 50 million people.

In the frame of COP21 and IYL 2015, the Human Energy project allowed participants to generate power through running, dance, and cycling etc. to light up the Eiffel Tower.  Another project during COP21 was Phares, a beacon of light sculpture installed at the Place de La Concorde. Elsewhere in France, the largest artistic sundial in Europe was inaugurated on 21 June 2015 to mark the Summer Solstice during IYL 2015

In Germany, the Centre for International Light Art in Unna awarded the first International Light Art Award on 22 January 2015. The event also included a scientific introduction to the main themes of IYL 2015. An exhibition Sorolla: The Art of Light ran in Madrid from 14 July 2015 to 18 January 2016 displaying works by the Spanish painter Joaquín Sorolla, analysing his techniques that gave him the reputation of "the painter of light." During the year, the Prado Museum in Madrid also hosted a documentary where researchers linked the themes of IYL 2015 to the museum displays. In France, Au Prisme d'Augustin Fresnel was a one-day event at the Louvre in Paris on 2 November 2015 on art and the development of impressionism in the 19th Century. Light and Dark Matters was a series of events organised by the Tate Modern art gallery and Founding Partner IOP in London from 20–21 November 2015, bringing together artists, scientists, philosophers and the public to share experiences on light.

The Museum of Light in Mexico City ran many events in 2015, including lectures and displays, outreach for children and teachers, and the Beyond Light exhibit prepared for the National Science Week that took place from 7–13 November 2015. The Museum of Contemporary Art Australia in Sydney ran the Light Show exhibition from 16 April-5 July 2015 and developed accompanying events for IYL 2015 including public lectures and interactive exhibits.  An overlapping exhibit, Luminous, featured works by indigenous artists.  A feature of events in South Africa was the inclusion of a strong art and science programme in remote regions of the country, derelict buildings, and construction sites.

Photography 
Many photography contests in the framework of the IYL 2015 attracted thousands of entries from around the world.  Such contests were held on the local level (e.g. in Norway and Uruguay), on the national level (India, which involved over 1,000 schools), and internationally (SPIE's IYL 2015 Photo Contest).

Literature 
Light has always been a theme of inspiration for literature, and events linking light and the written word were also frequent during 2015. The UK's National Poetry Day on 8 October 2015 adopted the theme of light with the sharing of publicly submitted poems and a free book, LIGHT – A National Poetry Day Anthology. Australia's National Science Channel RiAus organized a scientific haiku contest to reflect the National Science Week theme Making waves – the science of light.  IYL 2015 activities in Rio de Janeiro were closed with the Light for Poets series of public conferences. In the Russian Federation, the Words & Light Anthology received entries from more than 400 authors from 19 countries.

Theatre and Film 
Several partners developed special theatrical shows for IYL 2015. The Amazing Theatre of Physics in the Czech Republic visited many schools with their play explaining the physics behind light. Looking for Ibn Al-Haytham was the title of a musical performed in Toledo by the IES Princesa Galiana, a Spanish high school. The student theatre group of the Université de Franche-Comté in France ran a series of outreach events all year, including Eclats a specially written performance on light and its properties.

Over 100 short videos and/or documentaries related to the theme of light or especially commissioned for IYL 2015 were released during 2015. The short film 1001 Inventions and the World of Ibn Al-Haytham premiered at the 12th Dubai Film Festival on December 2015 and represented the last film of the late renowned Egyptian actor Omar Sharif. Einstein's Light by film maker Nickolas Barris and Leiden University described the innovative spirits of Albert Einstein and Hendrik Lorentz. Excerpts served as the official trailer for the IYL 2015 worldwide, and the premiere was held on 2 November 2015 during the Leiden International Film Festival. The French-German television channel ARTE developed a series of ten episodes called Avatars de Lumière dedicated to light-based technologies.  A film series commissioned by Physics World (IOP), Light in our Lives, covered applications of light and light-based technologies, with an international dimension reflecting the countries where they were produced – the UK, India, France, Mexico, and the USA.  Also in the UK, The Open University, the South East Physics Network and the Royal Astronomical Society created an animation to celebrate the anniversaries commemorated during IYL 2015.

Cinema Festivals around the world also decided to align their themes with the IYL 2015, including the Science Film Festival and the IYL 2015 Film Festival. Other Festivals included: the VerCiência International Festival of Science TV in Brazil, the 2nd Ethnografilm Festival in Paris, and the CINEMISTICA 2015 Film Festival in Spain.

Music 
Seven original compositions have been inspired by the IYL 2015 and have been featured in events ranging from the Opening Ceremony at UNESCO HQ to local conferences in events in over 50 countries worldwide.

Bruce Adolphe composed the score for the Nickolas Barris film Einstein's Light. The violinist for the soundtrack was Joshua Bell, performing with pianist Marija Stroke. The École Polytechnique and composer Jérôme Musiani released Step into the Light performed by Vince McClenny. Rainbow of Light was written by Linda Lamon and sung by soprano Katerina Mina.  Shine is a dedication to Ibn Al-Haytham, and features on Sami Yusuf's score for Ahmed Salim's film 1001 Inventions and the World of Ibn Al-Haytham starring Omar Sharif.  Faro de Estrellas was a song composed and arranged by the Italian duo Jalisse based on lyrics by Sandra von Borries in Spanish submitted as part of the IYL 2015 Light Song Contest. In Time of Light with words and music from PJ Moore was an electronic oratorio in celebration of James C. Maxwell.  The song C'è Luce was released as part of an IYL 2015 project in Italy by the Andare oltre si può association which promotes societal inclusion for people with Down syndrome.

Links to videos of these songs are available from the IYL 2015 YouTube Channel and from the IYL 2015 website.

Publications 
Print and online publications ranging from scientific journals to newspapers and in-flight magazines released special content on the IYL 2015, permitting an extremely wide reach to the wider public.

In the scientific community, IYL 2015 learned society partners released a number of special publications throughout the year to raise awareness of IYL 2015 themes and topics (e.g. APS, DPG, EPS, IOP, OSA, SFO, SFP, SPIE, and others).  Other special issues include the Cuban Physical Journal and the leading Russian journal Optics and Spectroscopy.

Publishers such as Elsevier, Springer, and Wiley also published special IYL 2015 issues or editorials. Nature Publishing Group and the Nature journals released articles and content that was updated throughout the IYL 2015. Nature Middle East published an interesting editorial at the end of 2015 discussing how Ibn Al-Haytham's legacy of scientific scepticism should be emulated across the Arab World. The IYL 2015 Media Partners published many special publications over the IYL 2015. The most prominent were featured in IYL 2015 Optics Bookshelf on the IYL 2015 website.

Several books were released on the themes of IYL 2015;  Celebrating Light and Inspired by Light: Reflections from the International Year of Light 2015 from SPIE; a children's book on Ibn Al-Haytham from 1001 Inventions and National Geographic; Kim Arcand and Megan Watzke - Light: Beyond the Bulb coordinators - presented a visual exploration of the power and behavior of light in Light: The Visible Spectrum and Beyond;  and The Wonders of Light - from Marta García-Matos and Lluís Torner also depicts the spectacular power of light.

Other commemorations 
The IYL 2015 was also celebrated in many other ways combining art, science, and innovative approaches to raising awareness with the general public.  The IYL 2015 logo was projected widely, including on The Globe of Science and Innovation at CERN, and was also the subject of large-scale light painting by the Light Painting World Alliance in Oviedo, Spain and on the North Sea in Germany. On a different scale altogether, a micron-scale logo was fabricated using advanced plasmonic colour laser printing technology at the Technical University of Denmark.  Other innovative ways in which the IYL 2015 logo appeared was as a hologram prepared for laser pointers, inside cakes, drawn with machine vision-robotic control, and included in a special design for a reindeer- themed Christmas decoration that was placed on the Christmas Tree outside the UK Prime Minister's residence at 10 Downing Street.

The IYL 2015 was celebrated in philately with stamps from 26 different countries: Algeria, Antigua and Barbuda, Bosnia and Herzegovina, Central African Republic, Equatorial Guinea, Gambia, Grenada, Guyana, Israel, Italy, Kyrgyzstan, Liechtenstein, Maldives, Malta, Mexico, Moldova, Montserrat, Portugal, Saint Kitts and Nevis, Sao Tomé and Principe, Serbia, Sierra Leone, Spain, The United Kingdom, Uruguay, and Vatican City.  The stamps depicted key IYL 2015 themes such as Cosmic Light (Sierra Leone), light pollution awareness (Gambia), optical phenomena (Sierra Leone), and light-based technologies (UK). The stamp from Liechtenstein included features that allowed hands-on experiments on light to be performed, and received the prestigious Red Dot design award in 2015. Other countries such as Romania issued special postmarks whilst stamps from countries such as Ghana and the Netherlands included related topics in science and lighting. San Marino and Spain also issued commemorative coins, the latter being the first official Spanish coin minted in colour. In other unexpected domains, national lottery tickets in Spain and Mexico included the IYL 2015 logo, and the International Year of Light was an inspiration to design a series of limited edition Art Label bottles for Campari.

See also
International observance
 2015 in science

References

Further reading
 "EPS President John Dudley explains the International Year of Light and Light-based Technologies", SPIE.TV video interview, February 2014.
 "International Year of Light -- Sustainability, Development, Education, History, Youth"  - SPIE IYL page

External links

 International Year of Light (official website)
 IYL 2015 Opening Ceremony (official video)

2015 in science
2015 in international relations
Light, International Year of
Science commemorations